Universidad Internacional SEK is an Ecuadorian university that has campuses in Ecuador, Chile and Spain.

Santa Laura
Universidad SEK also is owner of a football stadium in Chile. It is the fourth largest stadium in Chile and the home grounds to Unión Española.

See also
 Universities in Ecuador

External links
 SEK Home page

Universities in Ecuador